The 2018 FIM MotoGP World Championship was the premier class of the 70th F.I.M. Road Racing World Championship season. Marc Márquez entered the season as the reigning champion, with Repsol Honda being the reigning team champions and Honda the reigning constructors' champions.

Originally scheduled for 19 races, the season was reduced by one Grand Prix due to the cancellation of the 26 August Silverstone event due to unsafe track conditions involving standing water after a rider vote.

Marc Márquez clinched the championship trophy on 21 October 2018 after sixteen rounds, winning three consecutive races during spring, another three consecutive races during autumn and nine overall. Andrea Dovizioso finished in second and Valentino Rossi ended up in third, the former with four wins, while Rossi did not record a race win. Jorge Lorenzo with three wins and a win apiece for Cal Crutchlow and Maverick Viñales were the other race winners. Yamaha suffered their worst winless streak in their history with no wins for 25 races, which lasted from the 2017 German Grand Prix until Viñales won the Australian Grand Prix. KTM got their first podium finish at the Valencian Grand Prix with Pol Espargaro, finishing in third.

Teams and riders

All the bikes used series-specified Michelin tyres.

Team changes
 LCR Honda expanded to enter a second bike for the first time since 2015.
 Aspar Racing Team raced under the name of "Ángel Nieto Team" from 2018 in honor of the late Ángel Nieto.

Rider changes
 Sam Lowes was released from his contract with Aprilia Racing Team Gresini one year before it expired. Lowes returned to the Moto2 category.
 Thomas Lüthi moved up to MotoGP, making his début with EG 0,0 Marc VDS after competing in the intermediate class for eleven seasons.
 2017 Moto2 champion Franco Morbidelli was promoted to MotoGP, making his début with EG 0,0 Marc VDS.
 Tito Rabat returned to Reale Avintia Racing, after leaving EG 0,0 Marc VDS. He was partnered by Xavier Siméon who moved up to the premier class. Rabat previously competed with Avintia Racing under the name By Queroseno Racing (BQR) between the 2005 125cc and the 2011 Moto2 seasons.
 Takaaki Nakagami moved up to MotoGP with Team LCR.
 Scott Redding left Pramac Racing at the end of the 2017 season to join Aprilia Racing Team Gresini. His place was taken by Jack Miller.
 Loris Baz left MotoGP and returned to Superbike World Championship. During Mid-season, Baz replaced injured Pol Espargaró at Red Bull KTM Factory Racing for British GP.
 Héctor Barberá returned to the intermediate class, Moto2, after leaving Reale Avintia Racing. Barberá has completed eight seasons in the premier class.
 Jonas Folger, who was on the provisional entry list, withdrew from the 2018 season to focus on recovery from illness. Hafizh Syahrin moved up to MotoGP to fill his spot in Monster Yamaha Tech 3. He is the first Malaysian rider to compete in the sport's premier class.

Mid-season changes
 Randy de Puniet returned to MotoGP as the KTM test rider, replacing Mika Kallio who suffered a knee injury during German Grand Prix for the remainder of the season.
 Tito Rabat got injured after the British Grand Prix, so he was replaced by Christophe Ponsson for the San Marino Grand Prix. Jordi Torres also replacing him since Aragon Grand Prix onwards.
 Álvaro Bautista replaced Jorge Lorenzo at the Australian Grand Prix due to injuries sustained at the Thai Grand Prix, with Mike Jones to take Bautista's place.

Calendar
The following Grands Prix took place in 2018:

 ‡ = Night race

Calendar changes

 The British Grand Prix was scheduled to move from Silverstone to the new Circuit of Wales, but construction on the new track has not commenced. The two circuits reached a deal that will see Silverstone with an option to host the 2018 race. In the end, the British Grand Prix saw all three races being cancelled due to dangerous track conditions on race day, and was not re-arranged.
The Thailand Grand Prix is a new addition to the calendar, with the race scheduled for 7 October.
The Catalan Grand Prix used a new configuration of the Circuit de Barcelona-Catalunya, wherein the previous set of corners of turns 13, 14 and 15 were combined into a sweeping right corner. The new layout was previously used in Formula 1 from 2004 to 2006.

Results and standings

Grands Prix

Riders' standings
Scoring system
Points were awarded to the top fifteen finishers. A rider had to finish the race to earn points.

Constructors' standings
Scoring system
Points were awarded to the top fifteen finishers. A rider had to finish the race to earn points.

 Each constructor got the same number of points as their best placed rider in each race.

Teams' standings
The teams' standings were based on results obtained by regular and substitute riders; wild-card entries were ineligible.

Notes

References

 
MotoGP
Grand Prix motorcycle racing seasons